Habronattus is a genus in the family Salticidae (jumping spiders). Most species are native to North America. They are commonly referred to as paradise spiders due to their colorful courtship ornaments and complex dances, similar to birds-of-paradise.

Species
As of 2019, there were 106 recognized species:

 Habronattus abditus Griswold, 1987 – Mexico
 Habronattus aestus Maddison, 2017 – Mexico
 Habronattus agilis (Banks, 1893) – USA
 Habronattus alachua Griswold, 1987 – USA
 Habronattus altanus (Gertsch, 1934) – North America
 Habronattus americanus (Keyserling, 1885) – USA, Canada
 Habronattus amicus (Peckham & Peckham, 1909) – USA
 Habronattus ammophilus (Chamberlin, 1924) – Mexico
 Habronattus anepsius (Chamberlin, 1924) – USA, Mexico
 Habronattus arcalorus Maddison & Maddison, 2016 – USA, Mexico?
 Habronattus aztecanus (Banks, 1898) – Mexico
 Habronattus ballatoris Griswold, 1987 – USA
 Habronattus banksi (Peckham & Peckham, 1901) – Mexico to Panama, Jamaica
 Habronattus borealis (Banks, 1895) – USA, Canada
 Habronattus brunneus (Peckham & Peckham, 1901) – USA, Caribbean
 Habronattus bulbipes (Chamberlin & Ivie, 1941) – USA
 Habronattus calcaratus (Banks, 1904) – USA, Canada
 Habronattus californicus (Banks, 1904) – USA, Mexico
 Habronattus cambridgei Bryant, 1948 – Mexico to Guatemala
 Habronattus captiosus (Gertsch, 1934) – USA, Canada
 Habronattus carolinensis (Peckham & Peckham, 1901) – USA, Canada?
 Habronattus carpus Griswold, 1987 – Mexico
 Habronattus chamela Maddison, 2017 – Mexico
 Habronattus ciboneyanus Griswold, 1987 – Cuba, Jamaica
 Habronattus clypeatus (Banks, 1895) – USA, Mexico
 Habronattus cockerelli (Banks, 1901) – USA
 Habronattus coecatus (Hentz, 1846) – USA, Mexico, Bermuda
 Habronattus cognatus (Peckham & Peckham, 1901) – North America
 Habronattus conjunctus (Banks, 1898) – USA, Mexico
 Habronattus contingens (Chamberlin, 1925) – Mexico
 Habronattus cuspidatus Griswold, 1987 – USA, Canada
 Habronattus decorus (Blackwall, 1846) – USA, Canada
 Habronattus delectus (Peckham & Peckham, 1909) – USA
 Habronattus divaricatus (Banks, 1898) – Mexico
 Habronattus dorotheae (Gertsch & Mulaik, 1936) – USA, Mexico
 Habronattus dossenus Griswold, 1987 – Mexico
 Habronattus elegans (Peckham & Peckham, 1901) – USA, Mexico
 Habronattus empyrus Maddison, 2017 – Mexico
 Habronattus encantadas Griswold, 1987 – Ecuador (Galapagos Is.)
 Habronattus ensenadae (Petrunkevitch, 1930) – Puerto Rico
 Habronattus facetus (Petrunkevitch, 1930) – Puerto Rico
 Habronattus fallax (Peckham & Peckham, 1909) – USA, Mexico
 Habronattus festus (Peckham & Peckham, 1901) – USA
 Habronattus formosus (Banks, 1906) – USA
 Habronattus forticulus (Gertsch & Mulaik, 1936) – USA, Mexico
 Habronattus georgiensis (Chamberlin & Ivie, 1944) – USA
 Habronattus geronimoi Griswold, 1987 – USA, Mexico, Nicaragua
 Habronattus gigas Griswold, 1987 – Mexico
 Habronattus gilaensis Maddison & Maddison, 2016 – USA
 Habronattus hallani (Richman, 1973) – USA, Mexico
 Habronattus hirsutus (Peckham & Peckham, 1888) – North America
 Habronattus huastecanus Griswold, 1987 – Mexico
 Habronattus icenoglei (Griswold, 1979) – USA, Mexico
 Habronattus iviei Griswold, 1987 – Mexico
 Habronattus jucundus (Peckham & Peckham, 1909) – USA, Canada
 Habronattus kawini (Griswold, 1979) – USA, Mexico
 Habronattus klauseri (Peckham & Peckham, 1901) – USA, Mexico
 Habronattus kubai (Griswold, 1979) – USA
 Habronattus leuceres (Chamberlin, 1925) – USA
 Habronattus luminosus Maddison, 2017 – USA
 Habronattus mataxus Griswold, 1987 – USA, Mexico
 Habronattus mexicanus (Peckham & Peckham, 1896) * – USA to Panama, Caribbean
 Habronattus moratus (Gertsch & Mulaik, 1936) – USA, Mexico
 Habronattus mustaciatus (Chamberlin & Ivie, 1941) – USA
 Habronattus nahuatlanus Griswold, 1987 – Mexico
 Habronattus nemoralis (Peckham & Peckham, 1901) – USA
 Habronattus neomexicanus (Chamberlin, 1925) – USA
 Habronattus nesiotus Griswold, 1987 – Bermuda
 Habronattus notialis Griswold, 1987 – USA
 Habronattus ocala Griswold, 1987 – USA
 Habronattus ophrys Griswold, 1987 – USA
 Habronattus orbus Griswold, 1987 – USA
 Habronattus oregonensis (Peckham & Peckham, 1888) – North America
 Habronattus paratus (Peckham & Peckham, 1896) – Central America
 Habronattus peckhami (Banks, 1921) – USA
 Habronattus pochtecanus Griswold, 1987 – Mexico
 Habronattus pretiosus Bryant, 1947 – Puerto Rico, Virgin Is.
 Habronattus pugillis Griswold, 1987 – USA, Mexico
 Habronattus pyrrithrix (Chamberlin, 1924) – USA, Mexico
 Habronattus renidens Griswold, 1987 – Mexico
 Habronattus roberti Maddison, 2017 – Mexico
 Habronattus rufescens (Berland, 1934) – Marquesas Is.
 Habronattus sabulosus (Peckham & Peckham, 1901) – USA
 Habronattus sansoni (Emerton, 1915) – USA, Canada
 Habronattus schlingeri (Griswold, 1979) – USA, Mexico
 Habronattus signatus (Banks, 1900) – USA, Mexico
 Habronattus simplex (Peckham & Peckham, 1901) – Mexico
 Habronattus sugillatus Griswold, 1987 – USA, Mexico
 Habronattus superciliosus (Peckham & Peckham, 1901) – USA
 Habronattus tarascanus Griswold, 1987 – Mexico
 Habronattus tarsalis (Banks, 1904) – USA. Introduced to Hawaii
 Habronattus texanus (Chamberlin, 1924) – USA, Mexico
 Habronattus tlaxcalanus Griswold, 1987 – Mexico
 Habronattus tranquillus (Peckham & Peckham, 1901) – USA, Mexico
 Habronattus trimaculatus Bryant, 1945 – USA
 Habronattus tuberculatus (Gertsch & Mulaik, 1936) – USA
 Habronattus ustulatus (Griswold, 1979) – USA, Mexico
 Habronattus velivolus Griswold, 1987 – Mexico
 Habronattus venatoris Griswold, 1987 – USA
 Habronattus virgulatus Griswold, 1987 – USA, Mexico
 Habronattus viridipes (Hentz, 1846) – USA, Canada
 Habronattus waughi (Emerton, 1926) – Canada
 Habronattus zapotecanus Griswold, 1987 – Mexico
 Habronattus zebraneus F. O. Pickard-Cambridge, 1901 – Mexico

References

External links

Movies of Habronattus courtship behavior 
Habronattus at Tree of Life (by Wayne Maddison)
Jumping Spider Habronattus decorus photographs
Genus Habronattus at Bugguide.net
 Pictures of: H. alachua H. brunneus H. calcaratus ''H. carolinensis H. coecatus H. decorus H. georgiensis H. viridipess H. hirsutus H. mexicanus H. notialis H. ocala H. ustulatus
 Courtship of H. brunneus with mating song

Salticidae genera
Spiders of North America
Salticidae